"Brazil" is a song by English singer, songwriter, and musician Declan McKenna. Written by McKenna and produced by Max Marlow, it was released as the lead single from McKenna's debut studio album, What Do You Think About the Car? on 4 December 2015.

Critical reception
After putting just one song on his Bandcamp page, around forty managers heard of the song and rushed to his next gig to try to sign him. The song was written about the 2014 FIFA World Cup, the dismal poverty in the country and the corruption surrounding Sepp Blatter and other FIFA officials. BBC News called the song an extraordinarily mature song for a 16-year-old songwriter. Matt Wilkinson at NME called it "one of the best songs" of 2015, he said, "This bright’n’breezy Hertfordshire teen's first track 'Brazil' was one of the best songs of last year, recalling Jamie T right at the start of his career and being easily the finest song to ever be written about corruption in football."

The song went viral on TikTok in May 2022, resulting in "Brazil" reaching new highest peaks in the charts in the United Kingdom and Ireland.

Live performances
On 25 May 2016, McKenna performed the song live on the late-night talk show Conan, which was shown on TBS. He performed the song live at BBC Radio 1's Big Weekend 2017 on the BBC Introducing Stage.

Music video
A music video to accompany the release of "Brazil" was first released onto YouTube on 2 December 2014. The music video was directed by Dan Stokes.

Personnel
Credits adapted from Tidal.
 Max Marlow – producer, engineer, mixing engineer
 Declan McKenna – composer, lyricist, associated performer
 Barry Grint – mastering engineer

Charts

Certifications

Release history

References

2015 songs
2015 singles
Declan McKenna songs
Songs about Brazil